In architecture, the talus is a feature of some late medieval castles, especially prevalent in crusader constructions. It consists of a battered (sloping) face at the base of a fortified wall.

Feature
The slope acts as an effective defensive measure in two ways. First, conventional siege equipment is less effective against a wall with a talus. Scaling ladders may be unable to reach the top of the walls and are also more easily broken due to the bending stresses caused by the angle they are forced to adopt. Siege towers cannot approach closer than the base of the talus, and their gangplank may be unable to cover the horizontal span of the talus, rendering them useless. Furthermore, defenders are able to drop rocks over the walls, which will shatter on the talus, spraying a hail of shrapnel into any attackers massed at the base of the wall.

See also
Glacis
Counterscarp
Siege

References

Further reading

Medieval architecture
Castle architecture